Ernest Hayford Thorold, CB, CBE, (17 February 1879 – 6 February 1940) was an Anglican priest in the 20th century.

He was born into an ecclesiastical family in 1879 and was educated at Highgate School and The Queen's College, Oxford.

He became a Chaplain to the British Armed Forces in 1906 serving in Shorncliffe, southern Africa and Aldershot before gallant service in the First World War where he was Mentioned in Despatches twice and awarded the OBE and CBE. He was Staff Officer to the Chaplain-General at the War Office from 1916 to 1921 and then Chaplain at the Royal Military Chapel, London.

He was Assistant Chaplain-General, Western Command from 1924 and an Honorary Chaplain to the King from 1926 – 1935. He was then from 1935 – 1939 successively Chaplain to Kings George V, Edward VIII and George VI. After further commands with the Southern Command and the Aldershot Command he was Chaplain-General to the British Armed Forces (and also Chaplain of the Tower of London) from 1931 to 1939.

A Chaplain of the Order of St John of Jerusalem, he died on 6 February 1940.

References

	

I

1879 births
People educated at Highgate School
Alumni of The Queen's College, Oxford
20th-century English Anglican priests
Chaplains General to the Forces
Companions of the Order of the Bath
Commanders of the Order of the British Empire
Honorary Chaplains to the King
Holders of a Lambeth degree
1940 deaths
World War I chaplains
British Army personnel of World War I